In the mathematical field of abstract algebra, isotopy is an equivalence relation used to classify the algebraic notion of loop.

Isotopy of quasigroups 

Each quasigroup is isotopic to a loop.

Let  and  be quasigroups. A quasigroup homotopy from Q to P is a triple  of maps from Q to P such that 

for all x, y in Q. A quasigroup homomorphism is just a homotopy for which the three maps are equal.

An isotopy is a homotopy for which each of the three maps  is a bijection. Two quasigroups are isotopic if there is an isotopy between them. In terms of Latin squares, an isotopy  is given by a permutation of rows α, a permutation of columns β, and a permutation on the underlying element set γ.

An autotopy is an isotopy from a quasigroup  to itself. The set of all autotopies of a quasigroup form a group with the automorphism group as a subgroup.

A principal isotopy is an isotopy for which γ is the identity map on Q. In this case the underlying sets of the quasigroups must be the same but the multiplications may differ.

Isotopy of loops 

Let  and  be loops and let  be an isotopy.

A loop L is a G-loop if it is isomorphic to all its loop isotopes.

Pseudo-automorphisms of loops 

Let L be a loop and c an element of L. A bijection α of L is called a right pseudo-automorphism of L with companion element c if for all x, y the identity

holds. One defines left pseudo-automorphisms analogously.

Universal properties 

We say that a loop property P is universal if it is isotopy invariant, that is, P holds for a loop L if and only if P holds for all loop isotopes of L. Clearly, it is enough to check if P holds for all principal isotopes of L. 

For example, since the isotopes of a commutative loop need not be commutative, commutativity is not universal. However, associativity and being an abelian group are universal properties. In fact, every group is a G-loop.

The geometric interpretation of isotopy 

Given a loop L, one can define an incidence geometric structure called a 3-net. Conversely, after fixing an origin and an order of the line classes, a 3-net gives rise to a loop. Choosing a different origin or exchanging the line classes may result in nonisomorphic coordinate loops. However, the coordinate loops are always isotopic. In other words, two loops are isotopic if and only if they are equivalent from geometric point of view. 

The dictionary between algebraic and geometric concepts is as follows

 The group of autotopism of the loop corresponds to the group direction preserving collineations of the 3-net.
 Pseudo-automorphisms correspond to collineations fixing the two axis of the coordinate system.
 The set of companion elements is the orbit of the stabilizer of the axis in the collineation group.
 The loop is G-loop if and only if the collineation group acts transitively on the set of point of the 3-net.
 The property P is universal if and only if it is independent on the choice of the origin.

See also

Isotopy of an algebra

References

 

Non-associative algebra